= Pascal Johanssen =

Pascal Johanssen (born 1973, in Berlin) is a German gallery owner and founder of Direktorenhaus Berlin.

Johanssen studied law and worked in the innovation research of the design department of Universität der Künste Berlin. In 2005, he opened the Johanssen Gallery with its main focus on graphic art and illustration. In 2006, he founded "Illustrative" together with Katja Kleiss, an international biennial for contemporary illustration and graphic art in Berlin, which also took place in Zurich and Paris. In 2010, the gallery moved to a new venue in the Direktorenhaus situated at the Alte Münze in the center of Berlin, which had by then been established as the exhibition venue for design and contemporary arts and crafts. Johanssen is the curator of the international touring exhibition "Handmade in Germany," and editor of the magazine "Objects. Journal of Applied Arts" and co-editor of "Deutscher Manufakturenführer".

== Engagement ==
Several projects of Pascal Johanssen deal with the relationship of material culture and digital environments. Johanssen initiated the international touring exhibition "Handmade in Germany," which introduces the manual and artisan character of the production in manufactories as a sustainable model for work and life. Johanssen is editor of the magazine "Objects. Journal of Applied Arts," co-editor of "Deutscher Manufakturenführer" and initiator of "Deutsche Manufakturenstraße", a 3000 km long holiday route, which connects all manufactories of the different German regions.

== Publications ==
- With Thomas Schildhauer: Führungsmethoden im Innovationsprozess, in: Lutz Becker: Führungskonzepte und Führungskompetenz, Symposion Publishing GmbH, 2006, ISBN 9783936608809, S. 305–322; Vorschau
- eGovernment neu denken: Innovationsstrategien für die digitale Verwaltung, SER eGovernment Deutschland, Berlin 2006, ISBN 3-939117-81-1
- "Die große Walz". In: Objects. Journal of Applied Arts, No. 7, 2014, Berlin, S. 32–39
- "Mitteilungen aus dem Direktorenhaus". In: Objects. Journal of Applied Arts, No. 6, 2013, Berlin, S. 18–19
- "Kommt das Deutsche Design Museum?". In: Objects. Journal of Applied Arts, No. 5, 2012, Berlin, S. 16–25
